Three Major League baseball franchises have been named the "Washington Senators":

Washington Senators managers (1891 – 1899) - Managers of defunct National League team
Washington Senators managers (1901 – 1960) - Managers of American League team that became the Minnesota Twins
Washington Senators managers (1901 – 1971) - Managers of American League team that became the Texas Rangers